The Honnuhole River (also Honnu Holae and Suvarnavathi) is a tributary of the Kaveri River in Karnataka, India. It arises south of Kollegal near the town of Yelandur and flows into the Kaveri just northwest of the town of Kollegal.

Rivers of Karnataka
Geography of Chamarajanagar district
Rivers of India